Muaythai  (known as Muay until 2017) was featured in the Asian Indoor and Martial Arts Games official programme for the first time at the 2005 Asian Indoor Games in Bangkok, Thailand. It has been played at all editions since then. 

The International Federation of Muaythai Associations is governing body for muaythai at the Asian Indoor and Martial Arts Games.

Summary

Events

Fighting
The muaythai fighting competition is organized as a set of tournaments, one for each weight class.  The number of weight classes has changed over the years (currently 10 for men and 7 for women), and the definition of each class has changed several times, as shown in the following table. Weights were measured in kilograms.

Waikru
The muaythai waikru competition will be featured for the first time at the 2021 Asian Indoor and Martial Arts Games in Bangkok, Thailand.

Notes

References

 
Sports at the Asian Indoor and Martial Arts Games
Asian Indoor and Martial Arts Games